Laky is a surname. Notable people with the surname include:

Eva Laky, Hungarian sprint canoer
László Laky (born 2000), Hungarian footballer
Zsuzsanna Laky (born 1984), Hungarian beauty contestant

See also
Lake (surname)
Lasky